Ortadirek Şaban is a 1984 Turkish comedy film directed by Kartal Tibet.

Cast 
 Kemal Sunal - Şaban
 Bahar Öztan - Bahar Gökçe
 Yalçın Tülpar - Erkan
  - Adnan Bıçakçı
  - Çete Reisi Çakal
  - Şükrü Bey

References

External links 

Turkish comedy films
1980s sports comedy films